Thomas Scott Asbridge (born 1969) is a historian at Queen Mary University of London, a position he has held since 1999. He is the author of The First Crusade: A New History (2004), a book which describes the background, events, and consequences of the First Crusade, as well as of The Crusades: The War for the Holy Land (2010), a volume providing a view on the crusading movement, portraying the ideas of justified violence and jihad.

Asbridge graduated from Cardiff University with a BA in Ancient and Medieval History, before earning his PhD at the Royal Holloway, University of London. Asbridge's first major work was a revised version of his doctoral thesis, entitled The Creation of the Principality of Antioch, 1098-1130. Asbridge also wrote and presented a three-part BBC Two series on The Crusades, and was the historical consultant for Kingdom of Heaven (2005).

Asbridge has, more recently, expanded his retinue with books on Medieval England and France, the first major release being The Greatest Knight: The Remarkable Life of William Marshal, the Power behind Five English Thrones in 2015, based on the life of William Marshal, a knight within Eleanor of Aquitaine, Henry the Young King, and Richard I's retinue. Asbridge presented a BBC documentary on Marshal in 2014. He wrote a book for the Penguin Books monarch series on Richard I which came out in 2018.

References

Bibliography
 Walter the Chancellor, Walter the Chancellor's The Antiochene Wars, eds. & trans. T. S. Asbridge & S. B. Edgington (Aldershot, 1999).
 Asbridge, T. S., 'Alice of Antioch: A Case Study of Female Power in the Twelfth Century', The Experience of Crusading: Defending the Crusader Kingdom, eds. P. W. Edbury & J. P. Philips (Cambridge, 2003). 
 Asbridge, T., Richard I, The Crusader King (Penguin Monarchs) (London, 2018). 
 Asbridge, T., Talking to the Enemy: The Role and Purpose of Negotiations between Saladin and Richard the Lionheart During the Third Crusade, Journal of Medieval History (2013) vol. 39 (3), pp. 275–296.
 Asbridge, T. S., The Creation of the Principality of Antioch, 1098-1130 (Woodbridge, 2000). 
 Asbridge, T., The Crusades: The War for the Holy Land (London, 2010). 
 Asbridge, T., The First Crusade: A New History (London, 2005). 
 Asbridge, T., The Greatest Knight: The Remarkable Life of William Marshall (London, 2015).

British medievalists
Historians of the Crusades
Academics of the University of London
Academics of Queen Mary University of London
Alumni of Cardiff University
Living people
1969 births